Alan Dunbar (born 30 April 1990) is a Northern Irish professional golfer who won the 2012 Amateur Championship at Royal Troon. His home club is Rathmore Golf Club near Portrush, County Antrim.

Dunbar won the Ulster Youths Amateur Open in 2008, the St Andrews Links Trophy in 2009 and the North of Ireland Amateur Open and the Irish Open Amateur in 2010.

Dunbar played in the winning 2011 Walker Cup team. Partnered with Paul Cutler they won both their foursome matches, although Dunbar lost his singles match on the final day.

Dunbar won the Amateur Championship in June 2012 defeating Austrian teenager Matthias Schwab by one hole at Royal Troon. Dunbar and Schwab exchanged the lead five times in the 36 hole final. Schwab led by 1 hole after the morning round but after 5 holes of the afternoon Dunbar was 2 holes ahead. However Schwab was again 1 hole ahead with 2 holes to play, but Dunbar won the last two holes to gain a narrow victory.

Dunbar has played in the 2010, 2011 and 2012 Irish Opens but has failed to make the cut on each occasion. In the 2012 Irish Open at Royal Portrush he opened with a 71 (-1) but in the second round shot a 78.

His victory in the 2012 Amateur Championship brought Dunbar an invitation to the 2012 Open Championship. He had a disappointing opening round of 75 which included a triple-bogey and two double-bogeys and despite a second round 71 he missed the cut.

The Amateur Championship win also gave him automatic qualification to the 2013 Masters and 2013 U.S. Open provided he remained an amateur. He played in the Masters then turned professional, forfeiting his exemption to the U.S. Open. Dunbar made his professional debut at the Challenge de Madrid, an event on the second-tier Challenge Tour, where he missed the cut.

Amateur wins
this list may be incomplete
2009 St Andrews Links Trophy
2010 Irish Amateur Open Championship
2012 Amateur Championship

Results in major championships

CUT = missed the half-way cut

Team appearances
Amateur
Jacques Léglise Trophy (representing Great Britain & Ireland): 2008 (winners)
European Amateur Team Championship (representing Ireland): 2009, 2010
Walker Cup (representing Great Britain & Ireland): 2011 (winners)
Eisenhower Trophy (representing Ireland): 2010, 2012
St Andrews Trophy (representing Great Britain & Ireland): 2012
Bonallack Trophy (representing Europe): 2012 (winners)

References

External links

Male golfers from Northern Ireland
People from Portrush
Sportspeople from County Antrim
1990 births
Living people